The Ministry of Defence Guard Service (MGS) is part of the Defence Infrastructure Organisation of the Ministry of Defence, it provides Defence establishments across the United Kingdom with guarding and patrol services and was established as a response to the Deal Bombing. The Guard Service is one of the few remaining uniformed Civil Service agencies within the UK, and has been named an elite guarding service within the United Kingdom. They provide the highest level of security to Defence assets supporting critical Defence assets.

The MGS deals with access and pass control, initial response, key control, vehicle and personnel searching, security patrols of buildings and perimeter fences, dog patrols, CCTV, and alarm monitoring. It also performs other duties like helicopter marshalling, first aid provision, mail and baggage scanning, security sweeps, and health and safety guidance and the cordoning off of suspected bomb threats.

Organisation and grades 
MGS guards are now formally known as security officers (SOs), following a change in vocabulary guidelines that altered the use of the word from ‘guard’ to describe and Officer, this change was implemented to avoid confusion after the Army’s Queen’s Guard Regiments changed their rank ‘Guardsman’ to ‘Guard’ in late 2022. The following are MGS grades and epaulette insignia.

The Ministry of Defence Guard Service (MGS) is composed of staff at all grades between SZ2 and Senior Civil Servant (SCS) Pay Band 1 (SCS PB1). A list of these is - SZ2, E2, E1, D, C2, C1, B2, B1, SCS PB1. The non-uniformed staff in MGS cover a range of business management functions and grades, for example, secretariat, service delivery, assurance, personnel management, training, standards and stores roles from SZ2 to SCS PB1 level. 

Grades are often referred to by officers by the antiquated grading system’s number (e.g. CSO4 may be referred to as a "four" and CSO5 a "five"). The MGS also has support, administrative and managerial staff including programme and project managers, training staff and communications staff.

Dog section 

The MGS has its own dog section, made up of CSO5 (dog handlers) and military working dogs (MWDs), which provide support to other officers. The working dogs are a requirement to some MoD stations' licensing requirements to hold, store and distribute arms and ammunition, as well as other vital assets. The dogs within the MGS are recognised as force multipliers, in which the MGS say one dog team is as efficient as four officers working a beat patrol. The dog section adheres to MoD, military and statutory standards for training and welfare and are subject to the rules of engagement when met with fleeing suspects on defence estates.

Performance 

The MGS's standards are maintained through external accreditation. They hold the following awards:

 National Security Inspectorate (NSI) Gold Standard
 Customer Service Excellence (CSE) Award
 Committed to Equality (C2E) Award
 Government Security Team of the Year Award 2021

History
From 2004 to 2013 MGS and Ministry of Defence Police worked in the Ministry of Defence Police and Guarding Agency, and were based out of MDPGA Wethersfield (previously RAF Wethersfield) in Essex. In April 2013, the MDPGA was disbanded and the MGS joined the Defence Infrastructure Organisation.

From 2019 to 2020 MoD Guard Service personnel completed around 800,000 personal and vehicle searches across the Defence estate, confiscated over 9,000 out of date security and vehicle passes, reported just under 3,000 security breaches and completed over 117,00 environmental/energy conservation actions whilst undertaking patrols.

Operation Riverbank

At the request of the UK Border Force various officers from the MGS assisted in Border operations during a 7 week period whilst the London 2012 Olympics were ongoing. This included detached duties to London Heathrow, Standsted Airport, Coquelles and potentially other ports as part of operations that were left undocumented in the public domain. This detachment was completed with alongside the MOD Police, and officers were trained at MDPGA Weathersfield in order to work on the borders effectively.

Uniform and equipment

Although the MGS are a guarding organisation; they wear a similar uniform to police forces such as the MET Police Service. This consists of:

Standard issue CSO uniform 

 Short-sleeved white shirt (summer dress)
 Long-sleeved white shirt (winter dress)
 NATO "woolly-pulley" navy blue jumper
 Dark navy blue peaked cap (with MGS cap badge)
 Dark navy blue beret (only issued to officers stationed at air bases that host the United States Air Force)
 Black trousers (black combat trousers sometimes worn)
 Duty kit belt
 Black steel-toe-capped boots or shoes (officer specific)
 Black epaulettes denoting "MoD Guard Service" and grade
 Black waterproof trousers
 Black waterproof hat cover
 High visibility (printed with "MoD Security" in a navy blue box on breast and back) 
 High visibility light vest
 High visibility fleece (no epaulettes)
 High visibility waterproof coat
 Black British Army MkII combat glove

Additional dog section uniform

 Dark navy blue beret (with MGS cap badge)
 Black waterproof/foldable cap denoting "MoD"
 Black equipment vest
 Black field jacket
 Combat/cargo trousers

Other uniform 

 Black polo shirt with "MGS" logo on breast
 White overalls (for vehicle searching)
 Sealskin "beanie" hat
 High-visibility vest
 Official MOD Guard Service tunic (number two) worn on special occasions 
 Stab vest denoting department and role "MoD Security"

Equipment 
Equipment carried can include but is not limited to:

 Air-wave radio 
 LED torch or Maglite
 First aid kit
 Acid attack kit
 Vehicle search equipment 
 Security-infringement paperwork 
 Fire safety management plans 
 Official personal notebook (PNB) and pen

Foundation training

Currently MGS officers are expected to attend a ten day long foundation course which includes industry leading training  and equips officers with skills regarding service delivery and conflict management, emergency first aid (including trauma first aid) amongst other security and defence related training. This is then followed by a 6 month probation period where the officer will be assessed by their Operations Manager.

Capabilities

Project Servator 
Joined up working currently exists between the Ministry of Defence Police and Ministry of Defence Guard Service on Project Servator.

Operation Riverbank 

Operation in place to train and utilise MGS Officers within UK Borderforce in times of need.

Services 
Access control
 Control of access and egress
 Visitor reception duties
 Traffic control
 Control of passes
 Searching vehicles and personnel
 Control and issues of keys 
Patrols
 Security patrols of buildings and perimeters
 Dog patrols
Communication and monitoring
 CCTV monitoring
 Observation tower duties
 Alarm monitoring
 Liaison with other security providers 
Emergency response
 Contribute to counter terror planning
 Contribute to emergency response
Specialist duties
 First aid
 Unit security officer
 Scanning of mail and baggage
 Helicopter marshalling

Controversy

OMEC
In mid 2020 the Operational MGS Employment Contract (OMEC) was introduced to newly recruited officers, this contract saw that on paper officers would earn around £25,000 which is more than what the existing contract offered. However the OMEC contract sees that officers get less meal break time and owe more shifts (26 per year) to their management. In addition officers can no longer claim for weekend premiums, and current serving officers on the old MGS contract wishing to transfer or apply for promotion will be moved onto the OMEC contract. The MoD are currently not in a position to understand the MGS officer's concerns regarding the dispute which has led to officers in some areas taking industrial action.

Touch pass protocol
In August 2022 it was said that officers within the MGS at Devonport Dockyard may strike as the "touch pass protocol" was announced to be brought back after COVID-19 health and safety practices put a stop to it. It is said to be due to health and safety concerns.

Other organisations 
The MGS works alongside armed guard services—the Military Provost Guard Service in England, Scotland and Wales, and the Northern Ireland Security Guard Service (NISGS) in Northern Ireland. The Ministry of Defence Police (MDP) also work closely with the MGS, by providing an armed police service to the defence community and often act as the armed standoff or cover to the MGS whilst on guard.

The MGS also exist in within Germany as the Germany Guard Service (GGS previously CGSU (G))  similar to the afore mentioned NISGS.

See also
Ministry of Defence Police
Military Provost Guard Service
Northern Ireland Security Guard Service
Germany Guard Service

References

External links 
 

Ministry of Defence (United Kingdom)
Security organizations
Security guards